The 5th Politburo of the Communist Party of Cuba (PCC) was elected in 1997 by the 1st Plenary Session of the 5th Central Committee, in the immediate aftermath of the 5th Party Congress.

Members

Changes

References

Specific

Bibliography
Articles and journals:
 

5th Politburo of the Communist Party of Cuba
1997 establishments in Cuba
2011 disestablishments in Cuba